Aloysius de Gonzaga (9 March 156821 June 1591) was an Italian aristocrat who became a member of the Society of Jesus. While still a student at the Roman College, he died as a result of caring for the victims of a serious epidemic. He was beatified in 1605 and canonized in 1726.

Early life
Gonzaga was born the eldest of eight children, at his family's castle in Castiglione delle Stiviere, between Brescia and Mantua in northern Italy in what was then part of the Duchy of Mantua, into a cadet branch of the illustrious House of Gonzaga. "Aloysius" is the Latin form of his given name in Italian, "Luigi". Gonzaga was the son of Ferrante de Gonzaga (1544–1586), Marquis of Castiglione, and Dona Marta Tana di Santena, daughter of a baron of the Piedmontese Della Rovere family.  His mother was a lady-in-waiting to Isabel, the wife of Philip II of Spain.

As the first-born son, he was in line to inherit his father's title and status of Marquis. His father assumed that Gonzaga would become a soldier, as that was the norm for sons of the aristocracy and the family was often involved in the minor wars of the period. As early as age four, Luigi was given a set of miniature guns and accompanied his father on training expeditions so that the boy might learn "the art of arms". At age five, Gonzaga was sent to a military camp to get started on his training. His father was pleased to see his son marching around camp at the head of a platoon of soldiers. His mother and his tutor were less pleased with the vocabulary he picked up there.

He grew up amid the violence and brutality of Renaissance Italy  and witnessed the murder of two of his brothers. 

In 1576, at age 8, he was sent to Florence along with his younger brother, Rodolfo, to serve at the court of the Grand Duke Francesco I de' Medici and to receive further education.  While there, he fell ill with a disease of the kidneys, which troubled him throughout his life. While he was ill, he took the opportunity to read about the saints and to spend much of his time in prayer. In November 1579, the brothers were sent to the Duke of Mantua. Gonzaga was shocked by the violent and frivolous lifestyle he encountered there.

Gonzaga returned to Castiglione where he met Cardinal Charles Borromeo, and from him received First Communion on 22 July 1580. After reading a book about Jesuit missionaries in India, Gonzaga felt strongly that he wanted to become a missionary. He started practicing by teaching catechism classes to young boys in Castiglione in the summers. He also repeatedly visited the houses of the Capuchin friars and the Barnabites located in Casale Monferrato, the capital of the Gonzaga-ruled Duchy of Montferrat where the family spent the winter. He also adopted an ascetic lifestyle.

The family was called to Spain in 1581 to assist the Holy Roman Empress Maria of Austria. They arrived in Madrid in March 1582, where Gonzaga and Rodolfo became pages for the young Infante Diego. Gonzaga started thinking in earnest about joining a religious order. He had considered joining the Capuchins, but he had a Jesuit confessor in Madrid and decided instead to join that order. His mother agreed to his request, but his father was furious and prevented him from doing so.

In July 1584, a year and a half after the Infante's death, the family returned to Italy. Gonzaga still wanted to become a priest, but several members of his family worked hard to persuade him to change his mind. When they realized there was no way to make him give up his plan, they tried to persuade him to become a secular priest and offered to arrange for a bishopric for him. If he were to become a Jesuit he would renounce any right to his inheritance or status in society. His family's attempts to dissuade him failed; Gonzaga was not interested in higher office and still wanted to become a missionary.

Religious life

In November 1585, Gonzaga gave up all rights of inheritance, which was confirmed by the emperor. He went to Rome and, because of his noble birth, gained an audience with Pope Sixtus V. Following a brief stay at the Palazzo Aragona Gonzaga, the Roman home of his cousin, Cardinal Scipione Gonzaga, on 25 November 1585 he was accepted into the Society of Jesus in Rome. During this period, he was asked to moderate his asceticism somewhat and to be more social with the other novices.

Gonzaga's health continued to cause problems. In addition to the kidney disease, he also suffered from a skin disease, chronic headaches and insomnia. He was sent to Milan for studies, but after some time he was sent back to Rome because of his health. On 25 November 1587, he took the three religious vows of chastity, poverty and obedience. In February and March 1588, he received minor orders and started studying theology to prepare for ordination. In 1589, he was called to Mantua to mediate between his brother Rodolfo and the Duke of Mantua. He returned to Rome in May 1590. It is said that, later that year, he had a vision in which the Archangel Gabriel told him that he would die within a year.

In 1591, a plague broke out in Rome. The Jesuits opened a hospital for the stricken, and Gonzaga volunteered to work there. After begging alms for the victims, Gonzaga began working with the sick, carrying the dying from the streets into a hospital founded by the Jesuits. There he washed and fed the plague victims, preparing them as best he could to receive the sacraments. But though he threw himself into his tasks, he privately confessed to his spiritual director, Robert Bellarmine, that his constitution was revolted by the sights and smells of the work; he had to work hard to overcome his physical repulsion.

At the time, many of the younger Jesuits had become infected with the disease, and so Gonzaga's superiors forbade him from returning to the hospital. But Gonzaga—long accustomed to refusals from his father—persisted and requested permission to return, which was granted. Eventually he was allowed to care for the sick, but only at another hospital, called Our Lady of Consolation, where those with contagious diseases were not admitted. While there, Gonzaga lifted a man out of his sickbed, tended to him, and brought him back to his bed. But the man was infected with the plague. Aloysius grew ill and was bedridden by 3 March 1591, a few days before his 23rd birthday.

Gonzaga rallied for a time, but as fever and a cough set in, he declined for many weeks. It seemed certain that he would die in a short time, and he was given Extreme Unction. While he was ill, he spoke several times with his confessor, the cardinal and later saint, Robert Bellarmine. Gonzaga had another vision and told several people that he would die on the Octave of the feast of Corpus Christi. On that day, 21 June 1591, he seemed very well in the morning, but insisted that he would die before the day was over. As he began to grow weak, Bellarmine gave him the last rites and recited the prayers for the dying. He died just before midnight. Joseph N. Tylenda wrote that, "When the two Jesuits came to his side, they noticed a change in his face and realized that their young Aloysius was dying. His eyes were fixed on the crucifix he held in his hands, and as he tried to pronounce the name of Jesus he died."

Purity was his notable virtue. The Carmelite mystic, Mary Magdalene de' Pazzi, claimed to have had a vision of him on 4 April 1600. She described him as radiant in glory because of his "interior works," a hidden martyr for his great love of God.

Veneration

Gonzaga was buried in the Church of the Most Holy Annunciation, which later became the Church of Saint Ignatius of Loyola (Sant'Ignazio) in Rome. His name was changed to "Robert" before his death, in honor of his confessor. Many people considered him to be a saint soon after his death, and his remains were moved into the Sant'Ignazio church, where they now rest in an urn of lapis lazuli in the Lancellotti Chapel. His head was later translated to the basilica bearing his name in Castiglione delle Stiviere. He was beatified only fourteen years after his death by Pope Paul V, on 19 October 1605. On 31 December 1726, he was canonized together with another Jesuit novice, Stanislaus Kostka, by Pope Benedict XIII.

Patronage
In 1729, Pope Benedict XIII declared Aloysius de Gonzaga to be the patron saint of young students. In 1926, he was named patron of all Christian youth by Pope Pius XI. Owing to the manner of his death, he has been considered a patron saint of plague victims. For his compassion and courage in the face of an incurable disease, Gonzaga has become the patron both of AIDS sufferers and their caregivers. Gonzaga is also the patron of Valmontone, a town in Lazio.

Gonzaga is also celebrated in a small south Italy town called Alezio, as a patron of the town, celebrated on June 21.

Iconography
In art, Gonzaga is shown as a young man wearing a black cassock and surplice, or as a page. His attributes are a lily, referring to innocence; a cross, referring to piety and sacrifice; a skull, referring to his early death; and a rosary, referring to his devotion to the Blessed Virgin Mary.

Legacy

Saint Aloysius' feast day is celebrated on 21 June, the date of his death. 

Several buildings and institutions in Spokane, Washington, are named after Gonzaga. Gonzaga University is a Roman Catholic university which also has St. Aloysius Gonzaga Church on its campus, which is overseen by the diocese of Spokane. Gonzaga Preparatory School is a private Roman Catholic high school. Finally, St. Aloysius Gonzaga Catholic School is a K-8 school.

The Oxford Oratory Church of St Aloysius Gonzaga is the Catholic parish church for the centre of Oxford, England.
 
In Washington, D.C., Gonzaga College High School: Washington Seminary, as Gonzaga was originally called, began classes for lay students in 1821 and was renamed Gonzaga College. Gonzaga College High School is a Catholic college preparatory school for boys in grades 9–12.

St. Aloysius Gonzaga Church on the campus of Gonzaga High School in Washington, D.C., is used for graduation ceremonies of the high school. It had been an operating parish church until 2016. 

Another St. Aloysius Gonzaga parish is located within the Archdiocese of Washington in Leonardtown, Maryland, the seat of St. Mary's County, where the first major Catholic settlement in the Thirteen Colonies.

St. Louis School, Hong Kong is a primary and secondary school for boys in Hong Kong. 

Mount Aloysius College is a Catholic liberal arts college in Cresson, Pennsylvania.

Gonzaga College is a Jesuit Secondary School for boys in Dublin, Ireland.

St Aloysius' College is a Jesuit Secondary School for boys in Sydney, Australia.

St Aloysius' College is an independent, fee paying school in Glasgow, Scotland, which promotes the Catholic faith.

St. Aloysius Senior Secondary Schools are established throughout India.

St. Joseph in Gelsenkirchen, the location of German soccer club Schalke 04, has a glass window of the saint with a soccer ball and refers to the club colors and its strong fanbase.

Not long after Gonzaga's death, on his feast day in 1608, the three daughters of his brother, Rodolfo, established a community of women dedicated to education, under the formal name of the Noble Virgins of Jesus. This community still exists, although  it is currently reduced to two members.

See also

 Aloysius
Catholic Church in Italy
List of Catholic saints
St Aloysius (disambiguation)
Saint Aloysius Gonzaga, patron saint archive

References

External links

 

1568 births
1591 deaths
People from Castiglione delle Stiviere
Italian Roman Catholic saints
16th-century Italian Jesuits
Jesuit saints
Aloysius
Pontifical Gregorian University alumni
Burials at Sant'Ignazio, Rome
Angelic visionaries
Gonzaga University
Canonizations by Pope Benedict XIII